Tuscola Community High School (TCHS) is a public high school in Tuscola, Illinois, United States. It is part of the Tuscola Community Unit School District 301.

History 

High school in Tuscola dates back to the early 1870s, when it occupied the third floor of the Tuscola Union School; the first high school graduation was in 1875.  After the Union School burned on October 12, 1921, high school was held at the courthouse.

The first building solely for Tuscola High School was opened October 2, 1922, bounded by Sale, Niles, Overton and Indiana Streets.  That building was then used from 1957 to January 1969 as a grade school, after the newer high school was opened in November 1957, bounded by Daggy, VanAllen, and Prairie Streets.

The high school became part of Tuscola Community Unit School District 301 in the 1940s when the unit district was approved by public referendum.

Athletics 
Tuscola’s High School athletes participate in the Central Illinois Conference and are members of the Illinois High School Association. There is a broad range of sporting activities in which the students participate, currently numbering at least six different sports for boys and eight for girls.

Athletic honors 
 Boys Football: 2006–07 & 2009–10 (1st), 2007–08, 2010–11, 2011–12, 2017–18 (2nd)
 Boys Baseball: 2011–12 (2nd), 2017–18 (3rd), 2007–08 (4th)
 Boys Track: 2007–08 & 2013–14 (3rd)
 Girls Softball: 2011-12 (4th)
 Girls Track: 1992–93 (2nd)

Extracurricular activities 
There are a school band and a chorus and the school offers competitive quizzing.

Notable alumni 
 Linda Metheny, Olympic gymnast
 Fred Wakefield, NFL player

References

External links 
 

Education in Douglas County, Illinois
Public high schools in Illinois
Educational institutions established in the 1870s
1870s establishments in Illinois